Scuromanius is a genus of beetles in the family Mauroniscidae, historically included in the family Melyridae. The six known species of this genus are found in South America from Argentina north to Texas and California in North America.

Species
 Scuromanius anemonia Majer, 1995
 Scuromanius facetus (Casey, 1895)
 Scuromanius ferrugineus Majer, 1995
 Scuromanius liebecki (Blaisdell, 1929)
 Scuromanius testaceipes (Champion, 1914)
 Scuromanius wickhami Majer, 1995

References

Cleroidea
Cleroidea genera